This is a list of members of the Swedish parliament for the term 2014–2018. The MPs were elected in the general election held on 14 September 2014 and took office on 30 September 2014.

List of elected MPs

Members who resigned
{| class="wikitable sortable"
! Seat !! class="unsortable" | !! Member of Parliament !! From !! To !! Party !! Constituency !! Successor

References

External links 
members of the Riksdag in alphabetical order

2014-2018